The Men's 10,000 metres competition at the 2012 Summer Olympics in London, United Kingdom. The event was held at the Olympic Stadium on 4 August. The race was won by Mo Farah, the reigning 5000 metres World Champion, in a time of 27:30.42.

Summary 

From the beginning Farah stayed close to the race leaders, who on the first lap were the defending champion Kenenisa Bekele and his brother  Tariku.	
After six laps, the half marathon world record holder Zersenay Tadese and his Eritrean teammates began to push the pace. At the same time, Moses Kipsiro went down, causing the field to scatter and Farah to fall back in the field with his American training partner Galen Rupp.  When Tariku Bekele came up behind Tadese, his attempt to force the pace slowed.	
The 5000 metre mark was reached in 14:05.79, with Tadese in front, though Bedan Karoki Muchiri took the lead soon after. Thirteen runners remained in the lead pack including three Ethiopians, three Eritreans, two Kenyans, Kipsiro, Kenyan born Polat Kemboi Arikan running for Turkey, Canadian Cameron Levins, Farah and Rupp.  Strategic play continued as Tariku elbowed Farah, causing him to step to the outside ready to cover a move. Then the third Ethiopian Gebregziabher Gebremariam, ran to the front, but rather than forcing the pace, he seemed to slow it down.  With two laps to go, Tariku Bekele regained the lead, with Farah on his shoulder and Moses Ndiema Masai, Rupp and Michuri following in close formation.  At the start of the final lap, Farah made his move into the lead. For most of the last lap, Tariku Bekele, Muchuri, Rupp, and Kenenisa Bekele respectively remained in tow until the final turn at which point Farah pulled away for the win with a final lap of 53.48 seconds.  With 60m left, Rupp went outside and outsprinted Tariku Bekele to take the silver medal. Tariku Bekele held on for third place just ahead of his older brother and world record holder Kenenisa Bekele.

'Super Saturday' 

Farah's gold medal was the final of three gold medals in one evening for the host country, their most successful day in Olympic history.

Competition format
Only a final, without preliminary heats, was held.

Records
Prior to this competition, the existing world and Olympic records were as follows:

Schedule

All times are British Summer Time (UTC+1)

Results

References

Athletics at the 2012 Summer Olympics
10,000 metres at the Olympics
Men's events at the 2012 Summer Olympics